Marco de Canaveses is a city and municipality on Porto district, in northern Portugal. The population in 2011 was 53,450, in an area of 201.89 km². The city itself had a population of 9,042 in 2001.

Geography 

The city of Marco Canaveses is strongly influenced by its topography, with mainly areas at altitudes between 200 and 600 meters, reaching the highest levels in Aboboreira and Montedeiras Mountains. The highest point of the county is situated at an altitude of 962 meters, in Aboboreira Mountain, which is shared by the municipalities of Marco de Canaveses, Amarante and Baião. In Montedeiras Mountain is reached a peak of 640 meters. To the north it lies the Marão Mountain, in the municipality of Amarante. The region is also traversed by two of the most important Portuguese rivers, the Douro river and Tâmega river. The Douro, reaching from "Trás-os-Montes" region (interior north of Portugal), east to west course, limits the county to the south, separating it from the municipalities of Cinfães and Castelo de Paiva. The Tâmega, north to south course, limits much of the County to the west, separating it from the Municipality of Penafiel. Another river that runs along the county is the Ovelha River, reaching from the Municipality of Amarante. The City of Marco de Canaveses is located 56 km away from Porto, 18 km away from Amarante, the 19 km away from Penafiel, 18 km away from Baião and 30 km away from Cinfães.

Climate 

Due to its topography, Marco de Canaveses has an unstable and marked climate of extremes, with cold and rigorous winters and relatively hot summers. The coldest season of the year is typically long, with temperatures going often below 0 °C. Fog is also a constant. At this time, daytime temperatures rarely exceed 10 °C, and precipitation that results into the green landscapes of the county, may be a constant. The cold temperatures are more evident in the northern areas of the region, as well as in the Aboboreira and Montedeiras Mountains, where snow is common, registering sometimes freezing temperatures of -10 °C. Although these temperatures can be even lower, but it is not so often. In the city center the temperatures are a bit warmer and snow is not so common. With prevailing winds from west and southwest quadrants, is usually offered heavy rainfall on the higher places, decreasing as the lower slopes to the valleys. During the driest months of summer, temperatures above 30 °C may be recorded, sometimes reaching values near 40 °C. However, pleasant days of summer may be interrupted by constant cloudy weather days and some rain. Regardless of the season, cloudy days are common, being more frequent in the days of winter. The relative humidity is quite high, ranging between 75% and 80%. The intervening days are rare, and temperature differences rather abrupt.

Culture 
Marco de Canaveses is the birthplace of Carmen Miranda.

Parishes
Administratively, the municipality is divided into 16 civil parishes (freguesias):

 Alpendorada, Várzea e Torrão
 Avessadas e Rosém
 Banho e Carvalhosa
 Bem Viver
 Constance
 Marco
 Paredes de Viadores e Manhuncelos
 Penhalonga e Paços de Gaiolo
 Sande e São Lourenço do Douro
 Santo Isidoro e Livração
 Soalhães
 Sobretâmega
 Tabuado
 Várzea, Aliviada e Folhada
 Vila Boa de Quires e Maureles
 Vila Boa do Bispo

Hiking Trails
There are 7 acknowledged hiking trails  throughout Marco de Canaveses:

 PR1 - Pedras, Moinhos e Aromas de Santiago.
 PR2 - Dois Rios, Dois Mosteiros.
 PR3 - Caminho do Rio.
 PR4 - BAO/MCN/ATM Trilho dos Dólmens.
 PR5 - Caminhos de Canaveses.
 PR6 - Caminhos de Tongóbriga.
 PR7 - Aldeias e Margens do Rio Ovelha.

Notable people 
 Ângelo da Cunha Pinto (1948–2015) a Portuguese-Brazilian chemist and professor at Rio de Janeiro University
 Carmen Miranda (1909-1955) a Portuguese-Brazilian famous singer

Sport 
 Rui Casaca (born 1959) a Portuguese former footballer with 326 club caps
 Serafim Vieira (born 1966) a Portuguese former road cyclist.
 Pedro Ricardo Marques Pereira Monteiro (born 1978), known as Pedrinha, a retired footballer with 377 club caps 
 António Wesllem Sousa Monteiro (born 1985), known as Wesllem, a footballer with almost 300 club caps

References

External links

 Photos from Marco de Canaveses

Cities in Portugal
Municipalities of Porto District